Blake Rosenthal (born August 21, 1990 in Bryn Mawr, Pennsylvania) is an American figure skater who has competed as a single skater, pair skater, and ice dancer.  As a single skater, she is the 2007 U.S. junior pewter medalist and won the silver medal at the 2007–2008 ISU Junior Grand Prix event in Estonia.

As an ice dancer, she competed with Calvin Taylor. They were the 2005 U.S. novice bronze medalists and competed on the Junior Grand Prix.

As a pair skater, she began competing with Mac Kern in the 2009–2010 season. They placed 5th on the junior level at the 2010 Eastern Sectional Figure Skating Championships.

Competitive highlights

Singles career

Pairs career
(with Kern)

 J = Junior level

Ice dancing career
(with Taylor)

References

 
 
 

1990 births
Living people
People from Bryn Mawr, Pennsylvania
American female single skaters
American female pair skaters
American female ice dancers
21st-century American women